János Kulcsár (2 March 1927 – 27 June 1989) was a Hungarian sprint canoeist who competed in the early 1950s. At the 1952 Summer Olympics in Helsinki, he finished seventh in the K-2 1000 m event. He was born in Budapest.

References
János Kulcsár's profile at Sports Reference.com

1927 births
1989 deaths
Canoeists from Budapest
Canoeists at the 1952 Summer Olympics
Hungarian male canoeists
Olympic canoeists of Hungary